Vinger is a former municipality in the old Hedmark county, Norway. The  municipality existed from 1838 until 1964 when it became part of Kongsvinger Municipality. The municipality was located in the Vinger region in the southern part of the county, along the border with Sweden. The administrative centre of Vinger was located in the town of Kongsvinger where Vinger Church is located (the town was not actually part of the municipality, but this was where the councils met).

History
The prestegjeld of Vinger was established as a municipality on 1 January 1838 (see formannskapsdistrikt law). In 1854, the King issued a royal decree that declared the village area around the Kongsvinger Fortress to be a kjøpstad. On 7 February 1855, the town of Kongsvinger (population: 472) was separated from Vinger municipality to become a separate urban municipality. Afterwards, Vinger had a population of 10,947.

In 1864, the southern part of the municipality (population: 6,920) was separated from Vinger to form the new municipality of Eidskog. This division left Vinger with a population of 6,226. On 1 January 1876 a part of Vinger adjacent to the town of Kongsvinger containing 209 inhabitants was transferred to Kongsvinger. 
During the 1960s, there were many municipal mergers across Norway due to the work of the Schei Committee. On 1 January 1964, the municipality of Vinger (population: 6,257) was merged with the neighboring municipality of Brandval (population: 4,384) and the town of Kongsvinger (population: 2,349) which created a new Kongsvinger Municipality with a total population of 12,990.

Etymology
The whole region was historically called Vinger and this name was given to the municipality upon its creation in 1838. This name could be related to the river Glomma which flows through the region. One could compare this to the English word swing (for the missing s see Indo-European s-mobile). The river Glomma passes through the center of the district where the south-flowing river takes a sharp northwestward turn. This can be compared to the similar Lithuanian word vìngis which means "bend", "bow", or "turn".

Government
The municipal council  of Vinger was made up of 25 representatives that were elected to four year terms.  The party breakdown of the final municipal council was as follows:

Notable people
Notable people that were born or lived in Vinger include:
 Jørgen Young (1781–1837), timber merchant and member of the Storting
 Ivar Færder, a Norwegian newspaper editor and politician who was the mayor of Vinger

See also
List of former municipalities of Norway

References

Kongsvinger
Former municipalities of Norway
1838 establishments in Norway
1964 disestablishments in Norway